Tom and Jerry: Spy Quest is a 2015 American animated direct-to-video action comedy film produced by Warner Bros. Animation. Despite the film being purposed for the Tom and Jerry franchise, it is a crossover between Tom and Jerry  and Hanna-Barbera's Jonny Quest and served as a direct sequel to the original 1964 series. It is also the first Jonny Quest entry produced without the assistance of William Hanna and Joseph Barbera, who died in 2001 and 2006 respectively. It was originally released digitally on June 9, 2015, followed by a DVD release on June 23, 2015. In this film, Jonny Quest's original voice actor, Tim Matheson, is involved.

Plot 
The film begins with a trip to the beach for Tom and Jerry. On the same day, The duo later encounter Jonny Quest and Hadji, along with their canine companion Bandit. Tom fights off an evil cat army and sends them to retreat. Later, they meet Race Bannon who takes them to Quest Labs where they meet Johnny's father, Dr. Benton Quest, who happens to have the Q sphere, a device that will solve the world's energy problems.

Meanwhile, Dr. Quest's nemesis, Dr. Zin soon finds out about the device and he sends his bummbing henchcats Tin, Pan and Alley to steal the device and kidnap Dr. Quest. That evening, Tom, Jerry, Bandit, Hadji, Dr. Quest, Johnny and Race are having dinner. Tom is dissatisfied upon only having a bowl of milk, which leaves him still hungry when he and everyone else go to bed for the night. Before heading for bed, he learns and memorizes the security code, which is 1-2-3-4.

The security system is unlocked as Tom helps himself to the food and as a result, the cats easily break into the Quest Labs and abduct Dr. Quest along with Race and steal the device. Johnny Quest and Hadji wake up to see what has happened, rushing to the scene. They pinpoint to the location where the cat army has taken Dr. Quest and Race and rush off to rescue them. They head to Zin's island where Johnny and Hadji are captured by Zin's robots due to Tom's antics, However, Tom and Jerry escape.

Jerry decides to help them and Tom, who resist to help them, joins the fight where they help Dr. Quest, Johnny and Hadji escape and successfully destroy the volcano which was to attack the White House. Zin tries to escape on his escape pod, but it is stolen by his henchcats, who get tired of his abuse, forcing Zin to hold on to the pod. Tom, Jerry, Johnny, Hadji, Dr. Quest and Race escape from the island and are awarded by the President and the film ends with Tom chasing Jerry.

Voice cast 
 Reese Hartwig as Jonny Quest
 Eric Bauza as Dr. Benton Quest
 Michael Hanks as Race Bannon
 Tia Carrere as Jezebel Jade
 James Hong as Dr. Zin
 Joe Alaskey as Droopy
 Greg Ellis as Tin
 Jess Harnell as Pan
 Richard McGonagle as Alley
 Arnie Pantoja as Hadji
 Grey DeLisle as Carol
 Tim Matheson as The President
 Spike Brandt as Tom Cat, Jerry Mouse, Spike, Tyke, and Bandit (Uncredited)

Reception 
The film received positive reviews with praise for its humour and many critics calling it an improvement from previous crossover films.

Follow-up film 
Tom and Jerry: Back to Oz was released on June 21, 2016.

References

External links 
 

2015 computer-animated films
2015 films
2015 direct-to-video films
2010s American animated films
2015 action comedy films
2010s action adventure films
American action comedy films
American action adventure films
American television films
American children's animated adventure films
American children's animated comedy films
2010s children's fantasy films
Animated crossover films
Films directed by Spike Brandt
Films directed by Tony Cervone
Films scored by Michael Tavera
Films set in 2015
Animated films set in Florida
Films set in Romania
Films set in Washington, D.C.
Jonny Quest
Tom and Jerry films
Warner Bros. Animation animated films
Warner Bros. direct-to-video animated films
2010s children's animated films
2010s English-language films
Animated films about orphans